Lan (Chinese: 我們天上見) is a 2009 Chinese film directed by Jiang Wenli.

Cast
Yao Jun as Jiang Xiaolan
Zhu Yinuo as Jiang Xiaolan
Zhu Xu as Tang
Ma Sichun as Li Yingcui

References

External links

2009 drama films
2009 films
Chinese coming-of-age films
Films about the Cultural Revolution